Parmena bicincta is a species of beetle in the family Cerambycidae. It was described by Kuster in 1849. It is known from Croatia, Albania, Montenegro, and Bosnia and Herzegovina.

References

Parmenini
Beetles described in 1849